Caledoniscincus chazeaui, also known commonly as Chazeau's litter skink, is a species of lizard in the family Scincidae. The species is endemic to New Caledonia.

Etymology
The specific name, chazeaui, is in honor of New Caledonian zoologist Jean Chazeau.

Habitat

Behavior
C. chazeaui is terrestrial and diurnal.

Reproduction
The mode of reproduction of C. chazeaui is unknown.

References

Further reading
Sadlier RA, Bauer AM, Colgan DJ (1999). "The Scincid Lizard Genus Caledoniscincus (Reptilia: Scincidae) from New Caledonia in the Southwest Pacific: A Review of Caledoniscincus austrocaledonicus (Bavay) and Description of Six New Species from Province Nord". Records of the Australian Museum 51 (1): 57–82. (Caledoniscincus chazeaui, new species, pp. 72–74, figures 5, 11–13).
Smith SA, Sadlier RA, Bauer AM, Austin CC, Jackman TR (2007). "Molecular phylogeny of the scincid lizards of New Caledonia and adjacent areas: Evidence for a single origin of the endemic skinks of Tasmantis". Molecular Phylogenetics and Evolution 43 (3): 1151–1166.

Caledoniscincus
Skinks of New Caledonia
Endemic fauna of New Caledonia
Reptiles described in 1999
Taxa named by Ross Allen Sadlier
Taxa named by Aaron M. Bauer
Taxa named by Donald J. Colgan